Polomy is a rural locality (a village) in Pekshinskoye Rural Settlement, Petushinsky District, Vladimir Oblast, Russia. The population was 7 as of 2010.

Geography 
Polomy is located on the Somsha River, 39 km northeast of Petushki (the district's administrative centre) by road. Filatovo is the nearest rural locality.

References 

Rural localities in Petushinsky District